The Bishop of Horsham is an episcopal title used by a suffragan bishop (area bishop from 1984 to 2013) of the Church of England Diocese of Chichester, in the Province of Canterbury, England. The title takes its name after the market town of Horsham in West Sussex.

Horsham was one of the thirteen new post-English Reformation bishoprics and dioceses proposed by King Henry VIII in an ecclesiastical revision proposal written in the king's own handwriting. The subsequent reallocation of former monastic incomes allowed for the eventual creation of only six of these thirteen dioceses.  Nonetheless, an area of west Horsham became known as a 'Bishopric'. When new sees (both suffragan and diocesan) were established by the Church of England in the 20th century, the proposed Tudor dioceses which had not come into being were considered as episcopal titles. Horsham was one of those chosen (as was Leicester).

The current bishop is Ruth Bushyager. The bishops suffragan of Horsham were area bishops from when the Chichester area scheme was erected in 1984 until it was ended in 2013. The bishop oversees the archdeaconries of Chichester & Horsham.

List of bishops

See also

 Archdeacon of Horsham

References

External links
 Crockford's Clerical Directory - Listings

Bishops of Horsham
Anglican suffragan bishops in the Diocese of Chichester